Sylvana Foa (born January 31, 1945, in Buffalo, New York) is a former foreign correspondent and public affairs specialist. She was the first woman to serve as the foreign editor of a major international news organization, the first woman news director of an American television network, and the first woman to serve as spokesman for the Secretary General of the United Nations.

Early life
Foa was born in Buffalo, New York. Her family moved to Troy, New York when she was seven. She graduated from Barnard College of Columbia University in 1967. She was a Carnegie Foundation Fellow and majored in journalism and East Asian studies. She got her master's degree from Columbia in 1969.

Career

Journalism career
Foa began her journalism career in Phnom Penh, Cambodia, in late 1970. There she met Kate Webb, the United Press International (UPI) bureau chief who advised her to go to Saigon, South Vietnam. Finding work as a stringer for Newsweek, she worked in South Vietnam until February 1971 when Newsweeks Indo-China correspondent François Sully was killed, and Foa was sent to take over the Phnom Penh beat.

In Phnom Penh, she was considered one of the most dogged journalists, earning the enmity of high-level U.S. government officials. In April 1973, she was expelled from Cambodia at the request of the U.S. Embassy because of her reporting on the U.S. government's violation of the Cooper-Church Amendment. That amendment, passed in reaction to the 1970 invasion of Cambodia, forbade the provision of American advisors to the Cambodian army and prohibited all air operations in direct support of Cambodian forces.

Her reporting brought Richard Moose and James G. Lowenstein, Indochina investigators for the U.S. Senate Foreign Relations Committee, to Phnom Penh. When U.S. Embassy officials told them that Foa's stories were ridiculous, they went to her office to ask about the source of her reports. There they listened on Foa's transistor radio to embassy officials directing the bombing by American warplanes. The Senate ordered an immediate halt to the bombing of Cambodia.

After her expulsion from Cambodia, Foa joined UPI in Hong Kong. In October 1973, Prince Norodom Sihanouk agreed to an interview with her in Beijing. Foa spent nearly a month traveling across China. She was one of the first American reporters allowed to visit China, which was still in the throes of the Cultural Revolution. From Hong Kong, Foa had reporting stints in New Delhi, Rome, Vienna and Bangkok before being sent to Hong Kong as UPI's Asia Pacific news editor in 1982.

Foreign editor
In 1984, she was named a foreign editor of United Press International, becoming the first female foreign editor of a major international news organization. As a foreign editor, she supervised the work of 175 editors and correspondents covering news internationally. Her appointment as UPI's foreign editor two years later was short-lived. Foa had just completed a restructuring of the Mexico City bureau, when UPI was purchased by a Mexican—Mario Vázquez Raña. Vázquez called Foa into his office and ordered her to cancel the appointment of the new chief correspondent, Luis Toscano because Toscano "was not polite to the Mexican government." Foa refused and was fired.

News director and vice president for news
In 1986, she became vice president for news and news director of Univision, a Spanish-language network with 500 affiliates across the Americas. She thus became the first woman news director of a major U.S. television network. Emilio Azcarraga, a Mexican television magnate and Vázquez' biggest rival, was setting up a Spanish-language television network in the United States when he read reports of Foa's firing. He immediately hired her as his news director and vice president for news, telling aides "Anyone who tells Vázquez to stuff it is for us."

UN spokesman
In 1996, Foa became the first woman to serve as the spokesman for the United Nations Secretary-General in the 51-year history of the organization. In a profile of Foa in the New York Times of August 5, 1996, correspondent Barbara Crossette wrote that "When Secretary General Boutros Boutros-Ghali put Ms. Foa, a strong-willed and irreverent former journalist, in charge of his public image and that of the world organization in January, some diplomats were aghast. They still are." As UN Spokesman, Foa frequently clashed with the U.S. Administration, refusing to pay its UN dues, and seemed determined to oust Boutros-Ghali as a gesture to Senator Jesse Helms. Helms was rumored to have demanded Boutros-Ghali's removal as UN Secretary General in return for approving the appointment of UN Ambassador Madeleine Albright as US Secretary of State.

In July 1996, James Rubin, Albright's spokesman at the U.S. Mission to the U.N., threatened to investigate and take action against any UN employee found to be campaigning for Boutros-Ghali's re-election. Foa pounced. She accused the Clinton Administration of resorting to bully tactics akin to McCarthyism. She offered herself as the first target of the investigation "because I think he is doing a great job." Rubin backed down.

UN refugee work
In 1991, Foa was asked by the U.N. High Commissioner for Refugees to come to Geneva and overhaul their public image. She is widely credited with turning the agency into the most respected of all UN organizations. Foa had often covered refugee situations. Her father, Joseph V. Foa, had been forced into the flight when Italian dictator Benito Mussolini enacted racial laws aimed at the Jews of Italy. Foa spoke out repeatedly on behalf of Iraqi Kurds, Rwandans, and Bosnians. When Serb troops moved against the Bosnian enclave of Srebrenica, Foa urged the international community to speed up the deployment of peacekeepers to the region. The more than 50,000 people crowded in Srebrenica, she said, "are very frightened because they know, as we've seen, that the life expectancy of a Bosnian soldier on Serb territory is very short." "People don't do dirty things at night when international observers are walking around," said Foa. "I don't think the Serbs will risk the wrath of the world by moving in." However, in July 1995, more than 8,000 Bosnian men and boys were massacred in Srebrenica by units of the Army of the Republika Srpska led by General Ratko Mladic. The 400 Dutch peacekeepers were helpless in the face of the huge Serb force.

Foa gave UNHCR such a high profile that her work caught the eye of Secretary-General Boutros Boutros-Ghali. Some officials and diplomats assigned to the United Nations say that in response to the bad publicity, Mr. Boutros-Ghali wanted to give the United Nations a bold new face and image, particularly in the United States. Others say the Secretary-General saw Ms. Foa as a valuable personal asset in a year in which he would be seeking a second term. "He thought she could do for him what she had done for Mrs. Ogata [the High Commissioner for Refugees]," one European diplomat said.

Foa, aware that Washington was determined to veto Boutros-Ghali for a second term, made a symbolic statement about its unwillingness to pay dues. She carried a blue beret, like the ones worn by UN Peacekeeping forces around the world, to her daily briefing. Symbolically, she took off her hat to nations that did pay. Once, she had an intern arrive, dressed as an alien from outer space, to pay the dues of his planet. She encouraged Americans to send $4.40, the share of each American, to finance the UN, and people responded with tens of thousands of dollars in donations.

In July 1996, Burundi looked on the verge of repeating the 1994 Rwandan genocide beginning with the massacre of at least 304 people in Bugendana. Shortly thereafter, President Sylvestre Ntibantunganya was deposed. Foa urged the international community to act before they saw appalling TV images of slaughter. "Unfortunately, it is not until we see babies being macheted to death on TV that public opinion forces their governments into action," she said. "We do not want to see that this time." Together with the then head of the UN Peacekeeping Department, Kofi Annan, Foa aimed to put emotional pressure on the U.S. and other Western powers through the media. They wanted to shame the big powers into providing the political and logistics support to Burundi that they had refused for Rwanda in 1994. The effort failed. The United States did not feel it had vested interests in Burundi.

At the end of Boutros-Ghali's term, Foa moved to Israel to live with her long-time partner, businessman Shmuel Dankner. For several years she wrote a popular column, "Letter from Israel", for the Village Voice.

She occasionally undertakes missions for the United Nations or NGOs from Liberia to Uganda and teaches a course at local universities entitled "So, You Want To Change the World?"

Awards
Foa was twice nominated for a Pulitzer Prize. The first was for her coverage of the assassination of Indian Prime Minister Indira Gandhi, which included a 3,000–word profile based on an interview Foa conducted shortly before the Prime Minister's murder. The second was for her coverage of the 10th anniversary of the end of the Vietnam War, including an exclusive interview with Le Duc Tho.

References

1945 births
Living people
American women war correspondents
American war correspondents of the Vietnam War
American women journalists
American officials of the United Nations
Barnard College alumni
Columbia University Graduate School of Journalism alumni
American expatriates in Israel
American women in the Vietnam War
Television personalities from Buffalo, New York
Journalists from New York (state)
20th-century American women
21st-century American women